Dancin' wid da Blues Brothers is the fifth album by The Blues Brothers. It is a rare official Atlantic mini LP compiling seven tracks from previous albums, including four tracks taken from The Blues Brothers: Music from the Soundtrack album, two tracks from the Briefcase Full of Blues album, and one track from the Made in America album.

Track listing
 "Intro: I Can't Turn You Loose/Time Is Tight"
 "Peter Gunn Theme"
 "Shake a Tail Feather"
 "Soul Man"
 "Rubber Biscuit"
 "Do You Love Me/Mother Popcorn"
 "Gimme Some Lovin'"
 "Sweet Home Chicago"

Personnel
Elwood Blues – vocals, harmonica
"Joliet" Jake Blues – vocals
Ray Charles – keyboards, vocals on track 3
Matt "Guitar" Murphy – lead guitar
Steve "The Colonel" Cropper – guitar
Donald "Duck" Dunn – bass guitar
Paul "The Shiv" Shaffer – keyboards, background vocals
Murphy Dunne – keyboards, background vocals
Steve "Getdwa" Jordan – drums, background vocals
Willie Hall – drums
Lou "Blue Lou" Marini – tenor and alto saxophones
Tom "Triple Scale" Scott – tenor and alto saxophones
Tom "Bones" Malone – tenor and baritone saxophones, trombone, trumpet, background vocals
Alan "Mr. Fabulous" Rubin – trumpet, background vocals

The Blues Brothers albums
1983 compilation albums
Atlantic Records compilation albums